The Arizona Wildcats football statistical leaders are individual statistical leaders of the Arizona Wildcats football program in various categories, including passing, rushing, receiving, total offense, defensive stats, and kicking. Within those areas, the lists identify single-game, single-season, and career leaders. The Wildcats represent the University of Arizona in the NCAA's Pac-12 Conference.

Although Arizona began competing in intercollegiate football in 1899, the school's official record book does not generally include stats from before the 1950s, as records from this era and earlier are often incomplete and inconsistent.

These lists are dominated by more recent players for several reasons:
 Since the 1950s, seasons have increased from 10 games to 11 and then 12 games in length.
 The NCAA didn't allow freshmen to play varsity football until 1972 (with the exception of the World War II years), allowing players to have four-year careers.
 Bowl games only began counting toward single-season and career statistics in 2002. The Wildcats have played in eight bowl games since this decision, giving recent players a potential extra game to accumulate statistics.
 The Wildcats have surpassed 5,000 yards nine times in school history, all since 1998 and seven times since 2008. They have eclipsed 6,000 yards twice under former head coach Rich Rodriguez.

These lists are updated through the end of the 2020 season.

Passing

Passing yards

Passing touchdowns

Rushing

Rushing yards

Rushing touchdowns

Receiving

Receptions

Receiving yards

Receiving touchdowns

Total offense
Total offense is the sum of passing and rushing statistics. It does not include receiving or returns.

Total offense yards

Touchdowns responsible for
"Touchdowns responsible for" is the NCAA's official term for combined passing and rushing touchdowns.

Defense

Interceptions

Tackles

Sacks

Kicking

Field goals made

Field goal percentage

Footnotes

References

Arizona